Sanja Grohar (born 7 February 1984 in Kranj) is a Slovenian singer, model, tv host and influencer. 

She won the Miss Slovenia competition in 2005 and attended Miss World 2005. She also won the title of best Playmate in the Slovenian men's magazine Playboy and posed for FHM. She has released a number of singles since.

References

1984 births
Living people
21st-century Slovenian women singers
Miss World 2005 delegates
Slovenian female models
Slovenian beauty pageant winners
Musicians from Kranj
Slovenian pop singers